Solution 13 is a Finnish metal band consisting of Risto Stenroos, Sami Kukkohovi, Tarmo Kanerva and Petri Sääskö.

History 

In 2000, Petri, Ilkka Järvenpää and Tarmo started writing some songs, using the name Confusion Red. They recorded a demo CD in December, inviting Sami Kukkohovi (bass player of Sentenced) to play bass as a session musician.  He became a full member of the band shortly afterward.

In 2001, the band changed their name to Solution 13 and recorded a second demo. The German magazine Rock Hard used the track "No Reply" from this demo on a free compilation CD.

In November 2001, they recorded their self-titled debut album with producer Kari Vähäkuopus, which was released through Finland's Low Frequency Records in autumn of 2002.

Vocalist Ilkka Järvenpää left in March 2004 and was replaced by singer Risto Stenroos.

Roster

Current members 
Petri Sääskö – guitar
Risto Stenroos – vocals
Sami Kukkohovi – bass (also in KYPCK, formerly in Sentenced)
Tarmo Kanerva – drums (also in Poisonblack, formerly in Sentenced)

Support members 
Antti Remes – live bass (also in Poisonblack)

Former members 
Ilkka Järvenpää – vocals (now in National Napalm Syndicate)

Discography 

Never Let You Go
Grace
I Confess
Reflection of Prejudice

No Reply
Hallow Void
Breathe
Imitation of Me

Never Let You Go
Sink to My Level
Isolation
Demi-God
Regression
Breathe
Hate
Grace
Hallow Void
No Reply
Imitation of Me

References

External links 
Solution 13 at allmusic
Solution 13 at Encyclopaedia Metallum

Finnish musical groups